My Place Was Taken is a deathcore and hardcore punk band that originated out of Matamoros, Mexico. The band originated in 2014 and signed to Rottweiler Records in 2017.

History
My Place Was Taken began in 2014, as a project between vocalist Jesus Salaz and guitarist Abraham Barberi. Shortly after the formation of the project, the two added on bassist Helix Nebula and drummer Daniel Castaneda. The four recorded and produced a self-titled five-track EP, which caused the band to gain popularity in the Mexico metal scene. After gaining the notoriety, the band signed with Rottweiler Records, who was home to bands such as Death Requisite, Taking the Head of Goliath, and The Autumn League.

Following the band's signing to their new label, the band debuted a single, titled "Imparables". After the single and lyric video debuted, the band released their sophomore EP, titled Imparables. Following the EP's release, two music videos for "Cordeo Y Leon" and "Sociedad Demente". In 2020, it was announced that My Place Was Taken was to replace Broken Flesh on the Hasten Revelation tour, due to health concerns with Broken Flesh's vocalist. The band is set to perform on the tour alongside labelmates Taking the Head of Goliath, Cardiac Rupture, Abated Mass of Flesh, and Crimson Thorn.

Members
Current
Jesus Salaz - vocals (2014-present)
Abraham Barberi - guitars (2014-present)
Helix Nebula - bass (2014-present)
Daniel Castaneda - drums (2014-present)

Discography
EPs
My Place Was Taken (2015)
Imparables (2018)

Singles
"Imparables" (2017)

Music videos
"Cordero Y Leon" (2018)
"Sociedad Demente" (2019)

Lyric videos
"Imparables" (2017)

External links
Bandcamp

References

Mexican heavy metal musical groups
Metalcore musical groups
Deathcore musical groups
Christian metal musical groups
Musical groups established in 2014
Rottweiler Records artists
2014 establishments in Mexico